Bulimoscilla is a genus of sea snails, marine gastropod mollusk in the family Pyramidellidae, the pyrams and their allies.

Species
Species within the genus Otopleura include:
 Bulimoscilla fallax (Thiele, 1925)

Distribution
Species of this genus can be found in the Pacific Ocean off the Solomon Islands.

References

 Robba E. (2013) Tertiary and Quaternary fossil pyramidelloidean gastropods of Indonesia. Scripta Geologica 144: 1-191

Pyramidellidae